Rudy Bourguignon (born 16 July 1979 in Léhon) is a French decathlete. His personal best result is 8025 points, achieved in September 2005 in Talence. He is married with Dutch heptathlete Laurien Hoos.

Achievements

References

1979 births
Living people
French decathletes
Mediterranean Games silver medalists for France
Mediterranean Games medalists in athletics
Athletes (track and field) at the 2005 Mediterranean Games